Smokers Die Younger are a four-piece rock band from Sheffield, South Yorkshire, England. Their debut album opens with hardcore grunge rock and closes with avant-garde art-rock, taking in dub, country music, indie, and rock and roll.

Career
Smokers Die Younger are part of the underground live music scene of Sheffield, which has produced groups including Arctic Monkeys, Reverend and the Makers, Little Man Tate, Monkey Swallows the Universe, and The Long Blondes. They featured in a television documentary about music in Sheffield aired as Rockbyen Sheffield on Danish channel DR2 and as an episode of the Musikbyrån series on Swedish channel SVT in summer 2007.

Having played regularly at the Northern Sounds festival in France, they appeared on fashion mogul Karl Lagerfeld's compilation CD Les Musiques Que J'aime, published by Vogue magazine at the end of 2006.

Earlier in their musical careers, Golf had helped to found the electro-noise outfit that became 65daysofstatic and Trout had been instrumental in many cult British bands including A.C. Temple, Bear, Coping Saw, Kilgore Trout, Lazerboy, and Spoonfed Hybrid. Ian Turley has also played in The Ape Drape Escape, The Parallelogram, Pygmy Globetrotters and All Ashore! and is currently making solo music under his My Lo-Fi Heart moniker.

Band members
 James Goldthorpe (Golf) : vocals, guitars
 Rhys Edwards: keyboards, vocals
 Amy Dutronc : Autoharp, vocals
 Ian Turley : bass
 Neil Piper : drums
 Katherine Jackson : violin

Founding member, and bass player Graham Booth, left the band in late 2007. Also founding member and drummer Chris Trout left the band in 2009.

Discography
"SDY" 7" vinyl [Detail] Recordings. 6 December 2004
"Five-O" / "Kermit Song" 7" vinyl. Thee Sheffield Phonographic Corporation. 18 July 2005
"I Spy Dry Fear" Download-only single. Thee Sheffield Phonographic Corporation. 20 March 2006
X Wants The Meat CD album. [Detail] Recordings / Thee Sheffield Phonographic Corporation. 27 March 2006
"Sketch Pads" 7" vinyl. Thee Sheffield Phonographic Corporation. 21 July 2008
Smokers Die Younger. Download & CD album. 21 September 2009

References

External links
Official band site
Myspace band site

Musical groups from Sheffield
English rock music groups